Armon Deshawn Johnson (born February 23, 1989) is an American former professional basketball player who played two seasons in the National Basketball Association (NBA). He played college basketball for Nevada.

College career
In his three-year career at Nevada, Johnson averaged 14.3 points, 3.7 rebounds and 4.4 assists in 101 games.

Professional career
Johnson was selected by the Portland Trail Blazers with the 34th overall pick in the 2010 NBA draft. On August 2, 2010, he signed with the Trail Blazers after averaging 11.6 points and 4.2 assists in five summer league games. After a promising debut game on October 26, 2010, in which he scored six points with two rebounds and three assists in nine minutes, Johnson went on to have three double-figure scoring games in November, reaching a high in playing time of 22 minutes. However, his minutes and production declined over the following two months.

On January 28, 2011, he was assigned to the Idaho Stampede of the NBA Development League. He was recalled on February 22, 2011, then reassigned on January 4, 2012, and recalled again on January 15, 2012. On February 27, 2012, he was waived by the Trail Blazers. He signed a ten-day contract with the New Jersey Nets on April 9, 2012. On April 20, he signed with the Nets for the rest of the season.

On September 29, 2012, Johnson signed with the Orlando Magic. However, he was later waived by the Magic on October 23, 2012 after appearing in five preseason games. In December 2012, he joined Kazakh powerhouse team BC Astana. After scoring 13 points in his debut for Astana on December 16, he was ruled out for the rest of the season with a serious knee injury.

In March 2014, after passing a tryout period, Johnson signed with the Spanish team CB Valladolid for the rest of the season.

On July 7, 2014, Johnson joined the Los Angeles Clippers for the 2014 NBA Summer League. On July 29, he signed with Le Mans Sarthe Basket of France for the 2014–15 season. On October 29, 2014, he was waived by Le Mans after appearing in just five games. On April 2, 2015, he was acquired by the Austin Spurs of the NBA Development League.

On August 14, 2015, Johnson signed with Göttingen of the German Basketball Bundesliga. On September 15, 2015, he parted ways with Göttingen before the start of the season.

In 2016 he joined the Nevada Senators ABA team in Reno Nv.

Coaching career
Following his professional career, Johnson returned to the University of Nevada, Reno as an undergrad assistant under Head Coach Eric Musselman. After a couple year stint with the Wolf Pack, he was hired as the head coach of Excel Christian School, a small 1A academy in Sparks, Nevada. In his one season at Excel Christian School, Johnson failed to win a game, going 0-12. In May 2021, Johnson was hired as the head varsity basketball coach for Robert McQueen High School where he currently coaches. As of December 31, 2021, Johnson is 7-2 with the Lancers. His overall prep coaching record stands at 7-14.

References

External links
Nevada Wolf Pack bio
NBADraft.net profile
FIBA.com profile
https://www.basketball-reference.com/players/j/johnsar02.html

1989 births
Living people
American expatriate basketball people in France
American expatriate basketball people in Kazakhstan
American expatriate basketball people in Spain
American men's basketball players
Austin Spurs players
Basketball players from Nevada
BC Astana players
CB Valladolid players
Idaho Stampede players
Le Mans Sarthe Basket players
Liga ACB players
Nevada Wolf Pack men's basketball players
New Jersey Nets players
Point guards
Portland Trail Blazers draft picks
Portland Trail Blazers players
Sportspeople from Reno, Nevada
Basketball players from Chicago